My Name Is Joe is the third studio album by American R&B singer Joe, released April 18, 2000, on Jive Records. Production was handled by Joe and several other record producers including Allen "Allstar" Gordon, Teddy Riley and Tim & Bob. Beforehand, Joe released All That I Am (1997), which was his most successful album prior to the release of My Name Is Joe. Upon its release, My Name Is Joe received favorable reviews from critics, with most appreciating the love feel of the album.

The album peaked at number 2 on the US Billboard 200 and topped the US R&B/Hip-Hop Albums. It charted internationally as well, peaking within the top 10 in Netherlands and Canada as well as appearing in Australia, France, Sweden, and the UK. My Name Is Joe contained three singles—"I Wanna Know", "Treat Her Like a Lady", and "Stutter"—the first and last of which appeared within the top five of the US Billboard Hot 100. The album has been certified triple-platinum by the Recording Industry Association of America (RIAA), certified platinum by Music Canada, and certified silver by the Syndicat National de l'Édition Phonographique (SNEP).

Reception

Commercial performance 
My Name Is Joe debuted at number two on the US Billboard 200 behind NSYNC's No Strings Attached, selling 286,000 copies in its first week. It serves as Joe's first top-ten album in the United States.
This album was a huge success in Japan and especially in South Africa, hitting #1 for 18 consecutive weeks. It also received wide acclaim in the United States.

Track listing 

On digital versions of the album, "Stutter (Double Take Remix)" replaces "Black Hawk" as track 11.

Personnel 
Credits for My Name Is Joe adapted from Allmusic.

 Sanford Allen – concert master
 Timmy Allen – keyboards, producer, programming
 Tim Kelley - keyboards, drum programming, guitar, engineer, mixing
 James Biondolillo – string arrangements
 Andy Blakelock – engineer
 Joel Campbell – producer
 Dana Jon Chappelle – editing, engineer
 Earl Cohen – engineer
 Steve Cooper – assistant engineer
 Steve Croom - Recording Engineer
 Kevin "KD" Davis – mixing
 Andrew Felluss – assistant engineer
 John Fundi – engineer
 Brian Garten – assistant engineer, editing, engineer
 Stephen George – mixing
 Mark "Exit" Goodchild – mixing assistant
 Allen Gordon, Jr. – producer
 Onaje Allan Gumbs – Fender Rhodes
 Mick Guzauski – mixing
 Roy "Royalty" Hamilton – programming
 Jean-Marie Horvat – mixing
 Steve Huff – producer
 Ken "Duro" Ifill – remix producer

 Joe – keyboards, producer, programming, vocals, background vocals
 Bashiri Johnson – percussion
 Andrew Lyn – mixing assistant
 Manny Marroquin – mixing
 George Meyers – engineer, mixing
 Nick Morac – acoustic guitar
 Edwin "Tony" Nicholas – producer
 Paul Oliviera – engineer
 Hendrik Ostrau – assistant engineer
 Angelo Quaglia – engineer
 Teddy Riley – mixing, producer, programming
 Bob Robinson – producer
 Dave Russell – assistant engineer
 Eric Schlotzer – engineer
 Ron A. Shaffer – mixing
 Brian Smith – engineer, mixing
 Shane Stoneback – engineer
 Chris Trevett – mixing
 Jeff Vereb – engineer
 Frantz Verna – engineer
 Ted Wohlsen – engineer
 John Wydrycs – assistant engineer
 Jon-John Robinson - producer, drum programming, keyboards

Charts

Weekly charts

Year-end charts

Certifications

See also 
 List of number-one R&B albums of 2000 (U.S.)

References

External links
[ My Name Is Joe] at Allmusic

2000 albums
Joe (singer) albums
Jive Records albums
Albums produced by Tim & Bob
Albums produced by Focus...